Jack Hartley also known as Arthur James Hartley (18 August 1873 – 15 May 1923) was a South African international rugby union player who played as a wing. 

He made his only international appearance for South Africa in their Test—against Great Britain. He remains the youngest ever player to represent South Africa at international level.

References

1873 births
1923 deaths
South African rugby union players
South Africa international rugby union players
Alumni of Diocesan College, Cape Town
People from Krugersdorp
Western Province (rugby union) players
Rugby union wings
Rugby union players from Gauteng